Let's Get It may refer to:

Let's Get It: Thug Motivation 101, an album by Young Jeezy released in 2005
Let's Get It (Cash Out album), an album by Cash Out released in 2014
"Let's Get It", a song by Smoot featuring Jadakiss and Swizz Beatz, No.98 on the R&B charts in 2003
"Let's Get It", a 2001 song by G. Dep. feat. P. Diddy and Black Rob; see G. Dep discography

See also
"Let's Get It Started", song by The Black Eyed Peas
"Let's Get It On", song by Marvin Gaye